The 1984–85 Sheffield Shield season was the 83rd season of the Sheffield Shield, the domestic first-class cricket competition of Australia. New South Wales won the championship.

Table

Final

Statistics

Most Runs
Peter Clifford 889

Most Wickets
John Inverarity 41 & Carl Rackemann 41

References

Sheffield Shield
Sheffield Shield
Sheffield Shield seasons